Tom Curle (born 3 March 1986, in Bristol) is an English former professional footballer. He made appearances in the Football League for Mansfield Town and Chester City, where his father Keith Curle had spells as manager.

Curle made his professional debut as a late substitute in Mansfield's 1–0 home defeat to Yeovil Town on 20 September 2003. This was to be his only league appearance for the Stags, but he did feature in two Football League Trophy matches, one of which was against Darlington in which he hit an audacious shot from 35 yards which rattled the cross bar. The same season saw him have a spell on trial with Chelsea, spending a month there on trial playing in reserve games.

The trial did not lead to a permanent contract and Curle played for Bradford Park Avenue until he followed Keith to Chester in time for the 2005-06 season. Once again Curle's appearances were limited and just two substitute league appearances and another Football League Trophy outing followed. He remained at the club after Keith left in February 2006, but the following month he was released.

References

External links

Chester City profile and stats

1986 births
Living people
Footballers from Bristol
Mansfield Town F.C. players
Bradford (Park Avenue) A.F.C. players
Chester City F.C. players
English Football League players
Association football midfielders
English footballers